Lithosarctia kozlovi is a moth of the family Erebidae. It was described by Vladimir Viktorovitch Dubatolov in 2002. It is found in Sichuan, China.

References

 

Spilosomina
Moths described in 2002